Robert Moss, born in Melbourne (Victoria) in 1946, is an Australian historian, journalist and author and the creator of Active Dreaming, an original synthesis of dreamwork and shamanism.

Biography

Early life and education
Moss survived several life-threatening bouts of illness in childhood and traces his fascination with dreaming from this time.

He was educated at Scotch College, Melbourne, Canberra Grammar School and the Australian National University where he gained a BA (1st class honours and University Prize in History) and subsequently gained an MA in History. He was a lecturer in Ancient History at the ANU in 1969–1970.

Journalism and international affairs
In 1970, Moss started PhD research at University College, London, but soon accepted an invitation to join the editorial staff of The Economist. From 1970–1980, he was an editorial writer and special correspondent for The Economist, reporting from some 35 countries. He edited The Economist's weekly Foreign Report from 1974–1980, and wrote for many other publications, including The Daily Telegraph, The New York Times Magazine, The New Republic and Commentary. He was a regular commentator on international affairs on British television and the BBC World Service.

In a paper presented to the International Institute of Strategic Studies in 1971, Moss was one of the first to identify the emergence of international terrorism. He expanded his paper into his first book, Urban Guerrillas, published when he was 25. From 1971–1980, he was a visiting lecturer at the Royal College of Defence Studies in London. Moss drafted a speech for Margaret Thatcher in January 1976 which warned about the Soviet military build-up. In response to this speech Thatcher was labelled the "Iron Lady" by the Soviet Army newspaper Red Star.

He was awarded the Freedom Prize of the Max Schmidheiny Foundation at the University of St. Gallen in 1979.

Moss co-authored the novel The Spike with Arnaud de Borchgrave; it became a best seller in 1980.

Moss became a full-time writer and published a series of best-selling suspense novels including Moscow Rules and Carnival of Spies.

Interest in dreaming
In 1986, Moss felt the need to get away from the commercial fast track and moved to a farm in upstate New York, where he started dreaming in a language he did not know that proved to be an archaic form of the Mohawk language. Assisted by native speakers to interpret his dreams, Moss came to believe that they had put him in touch with an ancient healer – a woman of power – and that they were calling him to a different life.

Out of these experiences he wrote a series of historical novels and developed the practice he calls Active Dreaming, an original synthesis of contemporary dreamwork and various methods of journeying and healing. A central premise of Moss's approach is that dreaming isn't just what happens during sleep; dreaming is waking up to sources of guidance, healing and creativity beyond the reach of the everyday mind.

He introduced his method to an international audience as an invited presenter at the conference of the Association for the Study of Dreams at the University of Leiden in 1994.

Core techniques of active dreaming
 The "lightning dreamwork" process, designed to facilitate quick dream-sharing that results in helpful action; the use of the "if it were my dream" protocol encourages the understanding that the dreamer is always the final authority on his or her dream.
 Dream reentry: the practice of making a conscious journey back inside a dream in order to clarify information, dialogue with a dream character, or move beyond nightmare terrors into healing and resolution.
 Tracking and group dreaming: conscious dream travel on an agreed itinerary by two or more partners, often supported by shamanic drumming.
 Navigating by synchronicity: reading coincidence and "symbolic pop-ups" in ordinary life as "everyday oracles".

Publications

Early Writings on International Politics
Articles
"International Terrorism and Western Societies". International Journal, Vol. 28, No. 3, Revolution, Summer 1973, pp. 418–430. . .

Books
Urban Guerrilla Warfare. International Institute for Strategic Studies, 1971. 
Urban Guerrillas: The New Face of Political Violence. Maurice Temple Smith, 1972. 
Spain: Between Past and Present. Economist Brief Books, 1972.
The War for the Cities. New York: Coward, McCann & Geoghegan, 1972.  / .
Chile's Marxist Experiment. David & Charles, 1973.
The Collapse of Democracy. Maurice Temple Smith, 1975.

Reports
Urban Guerrillas in Latin America. Institute for the Study of Conflict, 1970.

Suspense Novels
 The Spike (with Arnaud de Borchgrave) (Crown, 1980)
 Death Beam (Crown, 1981)
 Monimbó (with Arnaud de Borchgrave) (Simon and Schuster, 1983)
 Moscow Rules (Villard, 1985)
 Carnival of Spies (Villard, 1987)
 Mexico Way (Simon and Schuster, 1990)

Historical Fiction
The Firekeeper: A Narrative of the New York Frontier. (New Edition, Excelsior/SUNY Press, 2009.)
Fire Along the Sky: Being the Adventures of Captain Shane Hardacre in the New World. (New Edition, Excelsior/SUNY Press, 2010.)
The Interpreter: A Story of Two Worlds New York. (New Edition, Excelsior/SUNY Press, 2012.)

Works on Active Dreaming
 Conscious Dreaming (Three Rivers Press, 1996.
 Dreaming True (Pocket Books, 2000.)
 Dreamways of the Iroquois (Destiny Books, 2004.)
 The Dreamer's Book of the Dead (Destiny Books, 2005.)
 The Three "Only" Things: Tapping the Power of Dreams, Coincidence and Imagination (New World Library, 2007.)
 The Secret History of Dreaming (New World Library, 2009.)
 Dreamgates: An Explorer's Guide to the Worlds of Soul, Imagination and Life Beyond Death  (Second Edition, New World Library, 2010.)
 Active Dreaming. (New World Library, 2011.)
 Dreaming the Soul Back Home. Shamanic Dreaming for Healing and Becoming Whole. (New World Library, 2012.)
 The Boy Who Died and Came Back: Adventures of a Dream Archaeologist in the Multiverse. (New World Library, March 2014.)
 Sidewalk Oracles: Playing with Signs, Symbols and Synchronicity in Everyday Life (New World Library, October 2015)
 Mysterious Realities: A Dream Traveler's Tales from the Imaginal Realm (New World Library, October 2018)
 Growing Big Dreams: Manifesting Your Heart’s Desires through Twelve Secrets of the Imagination (New World Library, September 2020)

Poetry
 Here, Everything Is Dreaming: Poems and Stories. (Excelsior/SUNY Press, April 2013).

Audio and Video
 Dream Gates: A Journey into Active Dreaming (audio; Sounds True, 1999.)
 The Way of the Dreamer (video series; Psyche Productions, 2004.)
 Wings for the Journey (Shamanic Drumming; Psyche Productions)

References

External links
 Website of Robert Moss
 Robert Moss personal blog
 Robert Moss Dream Gates blog on Beliefnet
 IASD (International Association for the Study of Dreams) Member Page for Robert Moss
 Robert Moss interviewed on "The Secret History of Dreaming" by ReadTheSpirit.com
 Robert Moss interviewed by Don Swaim, February 1, 1985
 Robert Moss interviewed by Don Swaim, June 16, 1987

Australian anti-communists
Journalists from Melbourne
1946 births
Living people
People educated at Canberra Grammar School